The District School Board of Niagara (DSBN, known as English-language Public District School Board No. 22 prior to 1999) is a school board in the public school system of Ontario, Canada, in the Regional Municipality of Niagara. Its head office is in St. Catharines. The DSBN operates schools in each of the twelve municipalities in the region. It employs close to 2,500 instructional staff to teach over 43,000 students in 97 elementary schools and 18 secondary schools. As of 2018, it was considered the top employer by number of employees in the Niagara Region. DSBN offers high school level courses online through Desire2Learn (D2L).

The board was created on January 1, 1998, as a result of the amalgamation of the Lincoln County Board of Education serving the boundaries of the former Lincoln County, and the Niagara South Board of Education which served the boundaries of the former Welland County.

Secondary schools

Stamford Collegiate began as Drummond Grammar School in 1856, Drummondville High School in 1871, Niagara South High School in 1882 and Stamford in 1907.

Former schools

Pelham District Secondary School (1949) began as a Pelham Continuation School in 1922 and closed in 1974.

Thorold Fonthill High School opened in 1958 and became a senior public school in 1970 due to decline enrollment and as Glynn A Green Public School since 2011.

Niagara District Secondary School was closed in 2010 and is now the site of the Royal Elite International Academy.

Fort Erie Secondary School and Ridgeway-Crystal Beach High School were closed and merged into a new school known as Greater Fort Erie Secondary School, in September 2017.

Grimsby Secondary School and Beamsville District Secondary School were closed in 2022 and merged into a new school known as West Niagara Secondary School.

See also
Niagara Catholic District School Board
List of school districts in Ontario
List of high schools in Ontario

References

External links
 District School Board of Niagara
 District School Board of Niagara Online Campus

Education in the Regional Municipality of Niagara
Niagara